is a Japanese theoretical physicist working in particle physics. Koide is known for his eponymous Koide formula, which some physicists think has great importance but which other physicists contend is merely a numerical coincidence.

Early life and education
Koide earned in 1967 a B.Sc. with major in physics and in 1967 a M.Sc. in Theoretical Elementary Particle Physics from Kanazawa University. In 1970, he received his Doctor of Science degree from Hiroshima University with a thesis “On the Two-Body Bound State Problem of Dirac Particles”.

Career
After working as a postdoc in the physics department of Hiroshima University and then a postdoc in the applied mathematics department of Osaka University, he became, from 1972 to 1973, a Lecturer in the School of Science and Engineering, Kinki University, Osaka. Koide was Assistant Professor (1973-1977) then Associate Professor (1977-1987) of General Education, Shizuoka Women's University, Shizuoka. From April 1987 to March 2007 he was a Professor of Physics at University of Shizuoka, Shizuoka and then retired as professor emeritus. In 1986 he was a visiting professor at the University of Maryland and in 2002 a visiting researcher at CERN. Koide was from April 2007 to March 2009, a guest professor at Research Institute for Higher Education and Practice, Osaka University, then from April 2009 to March 2011 a guest professor and from April 2011 a guest researcher at Osaka University, and from April 2010 a professor, Department of Maskawa Institute, Kyoto Sangyo University, Kyoto.

Contributions to physics
In the composite model of mesons, Koide's thesis demonstrated that a mass  of a composite particle which consists of the rest masses  cannot be lighter than  except for the case  when JP is not = 0-. This offered a severe problem for the quark model. (Koide’s work was done before the establishment of QCD.)

Katuya and Koide predicted that lifetimes of D± and D0 should be considerably different from what was at that time the conventional anticipation tau(D±)= tau(D0). Their prediction of these lifetimes was the first in the world prior to the experimental observation.

He published the famous Koide formula in 1982 with a different presentation in 1983.

Originally, Koide's proposed charged lepton mass formula was based on a composite model of quarks and leptons. In a 1990 paper, from the standpoint that the charged leptons are elementary, by introducing a scalar boson with (octet + singlet) of a family symmetry U(3), Koide re-derived the charged lepton mass formula from minimizing conditions for the scalar potential.

In 2009, he related the neutrino mixing matrix to the up-quark mass matrix. Koide and Hiroyuki Nishiura have published articles on a quark and lepton mass matrix model and a neutrino mass matrix model.

References

External links
 physics papers by Y. Koide available on arxiv.org
 Scientific publications of Yoshio Koide on INSPIRE-HEP

Japanese physicists
Theoretical physicists
Academic staff of the University of Shizuoka
1942 births
Living people
People from Kanazawa, Ishikawa
Hiroshima University alumni
People associated with CERN
Kanazawa University alumni